Nizhnaya Poltavka is a rural locality (a selo) in Nizhnepoltavsky Selsoviet of Konstantinovsky District, Amur Oblast, Russia. The population was 1,177 as of 2018. There are 12 streets.

Geography 
Nizhnaya Poltavka is located 31 km northeast of Konstantinovka (the district's administrative centre) by road. Klyuchi is the nearest rural locality.

References 

Rural localities in Konstantinovsky District